2019 Sulu bombings may refer to:

 2019 Jolo Cathedral bombings, in January
 2019 Indanan bombings, in June